Mirko Proroković (born July 27, 1978) is a Montenegrin professional basketball coach and former player. He is a head coach for Teodo Tivat.

External links
 KK Lovćen Cetinje

1978 births
Living people
KK Lovćen coaches
KK Teodo Tivat coaches
Montenegrin men's basketball players
Montenegrin basketball coaches